Heller Hobby GmbH is a French manufacturing company established in 1957 in Paris. Currently headquartered in Radevormwald, Germany, Heller produces plastic scale model kits of cars, aircraft, ships, and military vehicles.

History 
Heller was founded in Paris in 1957 by Léo Jahiel, born in Lyon. He had previously worked at SOMAP, a plastics company, and set up company headquarters on ue de Paradis in the 10th arrondissement of Paris, with a production facility in Trun, Orne. The first Heller's odel kit was a 1/100 scale Sud Aviation Caravelle, produced the following year. In 1963, a production facility was established in Trun.

In 1972, Heller joined with Solido (a die cast toy car maker), Jouef (an HO scale train maker) and Delacoste (maker of balloons and toys) to form "Le Jouet Français." In 1980 the company went into liquidation and was in Court directed administration in May 1981. The company was broken up: Majorette bought Solido, Vullierme bought Delacoste, and Jouef was bought back by a subsidiary company of the "CEJI" group (Compagnie Générale du Jouet).

On June 9, 1977 Heller's founder, Léo Jahiel, was made a member of the Légion d'honneur by President Valéry Giscard d'Estaing for his years of professional activity.

Heller was acquired in 1981 by the Hobby Products Group of Borden, Inc., owners of British model company Humbrol. In 1986 Airfix also joined the group. Production of Airfix kits, already in Calais, would subsequently move to the Heller factory in Trun.  Heller, with the rest of the Group was acquired by an Irish investment company, Allen, McGuire & Partners, in 1994, and received 31 million francs of investment.

In 1999 Heller re-branded as Heller SA and acquired, together with the Thirion group, French toy manufacturer Joustra. In 2005, Heller SA was acquired by French buyers but in 2006 once again the company went into administration.

In July 2006 the company was put into receivership and in November Hornby PLC bought sister brands Airfix and Humbrol but not Heller or its factory. By January 2007 Heller SA was transferred to "la société MANOP" (Manufacture d'Objet Précieux) under the direction Benjamin Leneman and over the next 7 years slowly returned to profitability selling model kits.

Heller SA yet again found itself in trouble in 2016. It was "in a situation of non-financial return due to cash flow problems and a decline consumption related to the November attacks." The Commercial Court of Argentan, on 11 March, approved the acquisition of Heller-Joustra (Heller SA) by Maped, following six weeks of administration. Maped, in partnership with entrepreneur Alain Bernard of the New York Finance Innovation (of Paris, France) had invested 3.5 million euros in Heller-Joustra.

On March 18, 2019, Antoine Lacroix, Directeur General of Groupe Maped announced that Heller was acquired by the company Glow2B of Germany, which had been the distributor of Joustra and Heller products in that country. They announced that production would continue in both France and Germany.

Ownership History

Product range

Aircraft 

The early Heller aircraft line — in a mix of scales 1/100, 1/72, 1/50 and 1/40 — were rather crude with large rivets, thick canopies, and low level of detailing. During the 1970s they concentrated on 1/72 and 1/50 and the quality improved rapidly, kits from the end of that decade were often very well detailed and sophisticated. The Heller line included many types of aircraft that couldn't be found elsewhere, like the Bloch and Potez twins, Dassault Ouragan and Dassault Mystère, Saabs Tunnan, J21 and Safir, and the big French transports, the Noratlas and the Transall. Notable later kits were the PZL-23, the Morane-Saulnier 230, and the SBC Helldiver (biplane).

Still later, Heller's Constellations, DC-4s and DC-6s were welcome additions to the 1/72 multi-engine flight line, along with the striking Canadair 215, a purpose-built fire bomber.

The early 1/50 helicopters were crude and questionable as to scale fidelity, but here again they were unique subjects: Frelon, Puma, Alouette, Gazelle, Llama.

Spacecraft 
Heller made a set Apollo kits which included the Command/Service Module and the Lunar Module. It was well-detailed for its time, however, the kit represented the Block I configuration of the Apollo hardware, which was not flown during the manned missions and was only used for early low Earth orbit test flights.

Heller also made a kit of the Ariane V in 1/125 scale.  The International Space Station was also made in the same scale as the Ariane V. They also made an Ariane IV in 1/125 and 1/288 scale.

Ships 
And there were ships, again unique as to subject.

Vehicles 
Heller made kits of the Citroën 11CV, the WWII-era front wheel drive sedan, in 1/43, 1/24 and 1/8 scales. There was a series of 1/24 old cars and small trucks including golden age European types—Delahaye, Delage, certain Bugattis, the 4.5-liter "Blower" Bentley, and others that were not, and have not yet been, kitted by other manufacturers in that scale. These were sophisticated kits for their time.

Heller contributed to the vast universe of 1/35 armor: lend-lease jeeps and deuce-and-a-halves, a Panhard armored car, and a squad of Chasseurs Alpins. Heller also produced a grand 1/35 Super Frelon, one of the first aircraft kits scaled to support the armor culture.

Figures

Monuments

Junior range 
Composed by the "Cadet" series of kits.

See also 
 Airfix
 Aurora
 ESCI
 FROG
 Italeri
 Hasegawa
 Matchbox
 Monogram
 Revell
 Tamiya

Bibliography 
 Rampin  Paolo ,  France  in  Miniature  1900-1980 ,  Edizioni PR ,  Milano , 2004 .

References

External links 

 
 Joustra homepage
 History of Airfix (also mentions Heller)

Model manufacturers of France
Model aircraft
Toy soldier manufacturing companies